An annular solar eclipse will occur on February 17, 2064. A solar eclipse occurs when the Moon passes between Earth and the Sun, thereby totally or partly obscuring the image of the Sun for a viewer on Earth. An annular solar eclipse occurs when the Moon's apparent diameter is smaller than the Sun's, blocking most of the Sun's light and causing the Sun to look like an annulus (ring). An annular eclipse appears as a partial eclipse over a region of the Earth thousands of kilometres wide.

Related eclipses

Solar eclipses 2062–2065

Saros 141

Inex series

Metonic series 
 All eclipses in this table occur at the Moon's ascending node.

References

External links 
 http://eclipse.gsfc.nasa.gov/SEplot/SEplot2051/SE2064Feb17A.GIF

2064 2 17
2064 in science
2064 2 17
2064 2 17